The Columbia Studio Recordings (1964–1970) is the third box set of Simon & Garfunkel recordings, released in 2001 by Columbia Records. This 5-CD set contains all of their studio albums from 1964 to 1970. The CDs are packaged in miniature recreations of the original LP jackets, and an annotated booklet is also included. 

The Columbia Studio Recordings succeeded the box sets Collected Works (1981) and Old Friends (1997). All five discs contain several bonus tracks of demos, alternate takes, single B-sides, unissued outtakes and non-album songs, some of which were previously issued on Old Friends.

Track listing
All songs written by Paul Simon, except where noted.

Disc one
Wednesday Morning, 3 A.M. (1964)
 "You Can Tell the World" (Bob Gibson, Bob Camp) – 2:45
 "Last Night I Had the Strangest Dream" (Ed McCurdy) – 2:09
 "Bleecker Street" – 2:43
 "Sparrow" – 2:47
 "Benedictus" (Traditional, arranged and adapted by Simon and Art Garfunkel) – 2:38 
 "The Sound of Silence" – 3:05
 "He Was My Brother" – 2:49
 "Peggy-O" (Traditional) – 2:25 
 "Go Tell It on the Mountain" (Traditional) – 2:05 
 "The Sun Is Burning" (Ian Campbell) – 2:46
 "The Times They Are a-Changin'" (Bob Dylan) – 2:51
 "Wednesday Morning, 3 A.M." – 2:14
Bonus tracks
"Bleecker Street" (Demo) – 2:42
 "He Was My Brother" (Alt. Take 1) – 2:48
 "The Sun Is Burning" (Alt. Take 12) – 2:47

 Track 7 is credited to Paul Kane, a pseudonym for Paul Simon.

Disc two
Sounds of Silence (1966)
 "The Sound of Silence" – 3:05
 "Leaves That Are Green" – 2:21
 "Blessed" – 3:14
 "Kathy's Song" – 3:17
 "Somewhere They Can't Find Me" – 2:34
 "Anji" (Davey Graham) – 2:15
 "Richard Cory" – 2:55
 "A Most Peculiar Man" – 2:29
 "April Come She Will" – 1:49
 "We've Got a Groovy Thing Goin'" – 1:57
 "I Am a Rock" – 2:49
Bonus tracks
"Blues Run the Game" (Jackson C. Frank) – 2:51
 "Barbriallen" (Demo) (Traditional) – 4:02
 "Rose of Aberdeen" (Demo) (Traditional) – 1:59
 "Roving Gambler" (Demo) (Traditional) – 3:04

Disc three 
Parsley, Sage, Rosemary and Thyme (1966)
 "Scarborough Fair/Canticle" (Simon, Garfunkel) – 3:10
 "Patterns" – 2:45
 "Cloudy" – 2:21
 "Homeward Bound" – 2:29
 "The Big Bright Green Pleasure Machine" – 2:47
 "The 59th Street Bridge Song (Feelin' Groovy)"  – 1:53
 "The Dangling Conversation" – 2:37
 "Flowers Never Bend With the Rainfall" – 2:10
 "A Simple Desultory Philippic (or How I Was Robert McNamara'd into Submission)" – 2:19
 "For Emily, Whenever I May Find Her" – 2:05
 "A Poem on the Underground Wall" – 1:52
 "7 O'Clock News/Silent Night" – 2:02
Bonus tracks
"Patterns" (Demo) – 2:53
 "A Poem on the Underground Wall" (Demo) – 1:51

Disc four
Bookends (1968)
 "Bookends Theme" – 0:32
 "Save the Life of My Child" – 2:49
 "America" – 3:36
 "Overs" – 2:15
 "Voices of Old People" (Simon, Garfunkel) – 2:07
 "Old Friends" – 2:36
 "Bookends Theme (Reprise)" – 1:20
 "Fakin' It" – 3:17
 "Punky's Dilemma" – 2:13
 "Mrs. Robinson" (From the Motion Picture The Graduate) – 4:03
 "A Hazy Shade of Winter" – 2:17
 "At the Zoo" – 2:23
Bonus tracks
"You Don't Know Where Your Interest Lies" – 2:17
 "Old Friends" (Demo) – 2:11

Disc five
Bridge over Troubled Water (1970)
 "Bridge over Troubled Water" – 4:52
 "El Condor Pasa (If I Could)" (Simon, Jorge Milchberg, Daniel Alomía Robles) – 3:06
 "Cecilia" – 2:55
 "Keep the Customer Satisfied" – 2:34
 "So Long, Frank Lloyd Wright" – 3:41
 "The Boxer" – 5:08
 "Baby Driver" – 3:15
 "The Only Living Boy in New York" – 3:57
 "Why Don't You Write Me" – 2:46
 "Bye Bye Love" (Felice and Boudleaux Bryant) – 2:53
 "Song for the Asking" – 1:50
Bonus tracks
"Feuilles-O" (Demo) – 1:42
 "Bridge over Troubled Water" (Demo Take 6) – 4:46

References

Simon & Garfunkel compilation albums
2001 compilation albums
Columbia Records compilation albums
Albums produced by Tom Wilson (record producer)
Albums produced by Bob Johnston
Albums produced by Roy Halee
Albums produced by Paul Simon
Albums produced by Art Garfunkel